Mirko Spelli (born 1 March 1973) is a former Italian male canoeist who won several medals at senior level of the Wildwater Canoeing World Championships and European Wildwater Championships.

References

External links
 Mirko Spelli at the Comitato Olimpico Nazionale Italiano

1973 births
Living people
Italian male canoeists